Jak may refer to:

Places
 Ják, a village in Hungary

People
 Jak Alnwick (born 1993), English football goalkeeper
 Jak Jones (born 1993), Welsh professional snooker player
 Raymond Jackson ("JAK") (1927–1997), UK cartoonist
 Jak Airport (c. 1955–2004), English guitarist born Jack Stafford
 Jak Knight (1993–2022), American actor, comedian and writer
 Jak Crawford (born 2005) an American racing driver
 José Antonio Kast (born 1966), Chilean politician

Fictional characters
 Jak (Jak and Daxter), in Jak and Daxter video games
 Jak (comics), in the UK comic book The Dandy

Other uses
 JAK members bank, a Swedish interest-free bank
 Janus kinase, a family of intracellular, nonreceptor tyrosine kinases including
 Janus kinase 1 (JAK1)
 Janus kinase 2 (JAK2)
 Janus kinase 3 (JAK3)
 JAK Australian slang abbreviation meaning Just Another Knob

See also
 Jack (disambiguation)
 Jaks, a list of people with the surname